In Symphony is a 2001 live concert album by Norwegian singer Sissel Kyrkjebø.

It was recorded during her  concerts held in Drammen Theater, Norway in September 2001. Sissel performed her most popular songs and some new songs in a new arrangement with a symphony orchestra. Paddy Moloney, Espen Lind, Kalle Moraeus and Sort Sol guested and performed duets with Sissel on these concerts, which also was broadcast on Norwegian and Swedish television.

In 2005 it was released as a bonus-DVD on Sissel's 2005 album release, Nordisk Vinternatt.

Track listing

CD
Innerst i sjelen
Solitaire
Våren
Å Vestland, Vestland
Vitæ Lux
Koppången (with Kalle Moraeus on violin)
O mio babbino caro
Se ilden lyse
Kjærlighet
Where The Lost Ones Go (duet with Espen Lind)
Mitt hjerte alltid vanker
Shenandoah (with Paddy Moloney and Kalle Moraeus)
Molde Canticle
Eg ser
Ave Maria (bonus track in Japan)

DVD
Innerst i sjelen
Kjærlighet
Where The Lost Ones Go (duet with Espen Lind)
Weightless
Vestland, Vestland
Våren
O mio babbino caro
Ella Rising (with Sort Sol)
O sole mio» (with Kalle Moraeus)
Shenandoah (with Paddy Moloney and Kalle Moraeus)
Eg ser
One Day
Se ilden lyse

Charts

References 

Sissel Kyrkjebø albums
2001 live albums